The Usambara akalat (Sheppardia montana), also known as the Usambara alethe or Usambara robin-chat, is a species of bird in the family Muscicapidae. It is endemic to the Usambara Mountains in Tanga Region of Tanzania.

Its natural habitat is subtropical or tropical moist montane forests.
It is threatened by habitat loss.

References

Usambara akalat
Endemic birds of Tanzania
Usambara akalat
Taxonomy articles created by Polbot